Tanakia latimarginata is a species of fish in the family Cyprinidae. It is endemic to South Korea, where it is found in the Nakdong River drainage.

References

Tanakia
Taxa named by Daemin Kim
Taxa named by Hyung-Bae Jeon
Taxa named by Ho-Young Suk
Fish described in 2014